ARA Narwal was an Argentinian fishing trawler, equipped for ELINT purposes during the Falklands War and captained by Asterio Wagata.

Operational history 
The ship had been given the task of shadowing the British fleet and performing ELINT operations along with other trawlers, and was observed for the first time by British air patrols on 29 April 1982.

The ship was hit by a 1000-pound bomb, but it failed to explode as it had been released below the lowest prescribed height and did not arm in time. The bomb caused heavy damage and the Harriers then strafed the Narwal with their 30mm guns. The aircraft were Sea Harriers of Fleet Air Arm 800 Naval Air Squadron, flown by Fl Lt Morgan and Lt Cdr Batt. The two Harriers had been dispatched to Port Stanley for a bombing mission, but the mission was not completed due to low clouds over the target area. On the return leg to Hermes they discovered the ship and obtained permission to engage the target.

A boarding party of British SBS men reached the target via a Sea King Mk.4 of 846 Naval Air Squadron and captured the ship dead in the water, taking off all of the men, and the body of Omar Alberto Rupp, the boatswain of the Argentine trawler, killed by the impact of the bomb. The Narwal was taken in tow, but sank the next day, 10 May. Among those captured was Captain Juan Carlos González of the Argentine Navy's information services, who was released after the war.

Aftermath 
Omar Alberto Rupp was buried at sea by the British on 10 May. Meanwhile, an Aérospatiale SA 330 Puma of the Argentine Army was sent to recover the crew of Narwal after receiving a distress signal, but was shot down by destroyer HMS Coventry with a Sea Dart missile, killing all three members of the crew.

References

Notes

Bibliography

External links
FV Narwal Wreck Site (116460)

Electronic intelligence ships
Falklands War naval ships of Argentina
Maritime incidents in 1982
Naval trawlers
Ships built in Belgium
Ships sunk by British aircraft
Shipwrecks of the Falklands War
1962 ships